Somedaydream is the self-titled debut studio album by Filipino musical project Somedaydream.

Album launch
Its grand album launch took place on November 29, 2011 at Phi Bar, Metrowalk.

Singles
The album's lead single, "Hey Daydreamer", reached no.1 on multiple radio stations. The song's music video featured actress Jasmine Curtis, and it was directed by Bianca King and Enzo Valdez. The song's music video was launched at Capone's last April 27, 2011 and it has already amassed over 1.3 million views on YouTube. An acoustic version of the song was released, which also became a single.
The song achieved further popularity when it was featured on Selecta Cornetto commercials. "Delivery Boys" was released as the third single from the album. The single's music video was launched on September 2, 2011 and became his second consecutive number one song on Myx. "Christmas Is Purple" was released to radio stations on November 9, 2011 and is Somedaydream's Christmas single for 2011. "Sing This Song" was the fifth single and was released to radio stations on February 8, 2012. These have since become hits in majority of these stations.

Track listing
All songs written and composed by Rez Toledo.

† The track is not actually included on the disc but rather as a mobile digital download with the use of a code included 
in the album packaging.

Personnel
 Rez Toledo, Andrea Bocobo (track 3) - vocals
 Nacho Cuyegkeng (track 5) - Electric guitars
 Pao (track 3), An Pantaleon and Monty Macalino (track 2) - acoustic guitar
 JR Jader of Runmanila (additional drums on track 4) - drums

Technical personnel
Executive Production - Champ Lui Pio
Production - Rez Toledo 
Co-production - Rez Toledo (track 6)
Additional engineer - Angie Rozul
Mixing - Angee Rozul (except for track 1) 
Mastering - Angee Rozul 
Art Direction and Graphic Design - Ramon Vizmonte
Photography - Chiqui Okol

References

2011 debut albums
Somedaydream albums